The Burgenlandkreis was a district (Kreis) in the south of Saxony-Anhalt, Germany. Neighboring districts are (from north clockwise) Merseburg-Querfurt, Weißenfels, Leipziger Land, Aschersleben-Staßfurt, Altenburger Land, Greiz, district-free Gera, Saale-Holzland, Weimarer Land, Sömmerda and the Kyffhäuserkreis.

History 
The district was created in 1994 when the districts Naumburg, Nebra and Zeitz were merged.

Geography 
Main rivers in the district are the Saale and its affluent Unstrut, and also in the south of the district the White Elster. The highest elevation is the Seeligenbornberg (355 m), the lowest elevation is in the Saale valley near Gosek (97.8m).

Coat of arms

Towns and municipalities

External links 
  (German)

Burgenlandkreis